The Saha Expo is a defense industry fair held in Turkey, and organized by the Association of SAHA Istanbul Defence, Aviation  and Aerospace Cluster. It was first held in 2018, and took place at Istanbul Fair Center Yeşilköy, Bakırköy.

The organizing association was formed in Istanbul by 27 defense companies in 2015. The fair hosts the products of companies, which design, develop and manufacture subsystems and components of advanced technology platforms in the field of defense, maritime, aviation and aerospace. It is planned that the event will be recurring Biennially. The fair is sponsored mainly by major Turkish defense companies, but also by local defense contractors.

183 companies, including 31 foreigner exhibitors, participated at the 2018 fair. Notable participants were ASELSAN, Baykar, BMC, Boeing, FNSS, HAVELSAN, Kale Group, MKE, Ministry of National Defence, military plants and naval shipyards, ROKETSAN, Turkish Airlines Maintenance, TÜMOSAN, Turkish Aerospace Industries and Tusaş Engine Industries.

See also
 International Defence Industry Fair (IDEF)

References

External links
Official website

Arms fairs
Fairs in Turkey
Biennial events
2018 establishments in Turkey
Recurring events established in 2018
Economy of Istanbul
Post–Cold War military equipment of Turkey
Bakırköy